An instrument landing system localizer, or simply localizer (LOC, or LLZ prior to 2007), is a system of horizontal guidance in the instrument landing system, which is used to guide aircraft along the axis of the runway.

Principle of operation
In aviation, a localizer is the lateral component of the instrument landing system (ILS) for the runway centerline when combined with the vertical glide slope, not to be confused with a locator, although both are parts of aviation navigation systems.

A localizer (like a glideslope) requires both a transmitting airport runway system and receiving cockpit instruments. An older aircraft without an ILS receiver cannot take advantage of any ILS facilities at any runway, and much more importantly, the most modern aircraft have no use of their ILS instruments at runways which lack ILS facilities. In parts of Africa and Asia large airports may lack any kind of transmitting ILS system. Some runways have ILS only in one direction, this can however still be used for the opposite direction (with a lower precision) known as back beam or "Back Course" which is not associated with a glide slope.

Two signals are transmitted on one of 40 ILS channels. One is amplitude modulated at 90 Hz, the other at 150 Hz.  These are transmitted from co-located phased array antenna elements. Each antenna transmits a narrow beam. In addition, a clearing signal is transmitted at one tenth of the power with a wider beam to prevent receivers from picking up the side lobes of the main beam.

The signals' phases at the antenna elements are arranged such that the  150 Hz signal is more prominent (has a greater depth of modulation) at a receiver located to the right of centerline, and the 90 Hz signal is more prominent to the left. The cockpit instrument uses the difference between the modulation strengths of the two received signals to indicate left or right deviation from centerline.

Carrier frequency pairings 
Localizer (LOC) and glide slope (G/S) carrier frequencies are paired so that the navigation radio automatically tunes the G/S frequency which corresponds to the selected LOC frequency. The LOC signal is in the 110 MHz range while the G/S signal is in the 330 MHz range.

LOC carrier frequencies range between 108.10 MHz and 111.95 MHz (with the 100 kHz first decimal digit always odd, so 108.10, 108.15, 108.30, etc., are LOC frequencies and are not used for any other purpose).

Localizer in cockpit

  

The localizer indicator is (on most aircraft manufactured from the late 1950s) shown below the Attitude Indicator, but is still a part of this instrument together with the glideslope indicator and the cross in the center of the instrument which is called Flight Director.  

The glideslope scale is located to the right of the attitude sphere. On aircraft which have a mechanical gyro compass are both the localizer and glideslope indicated as a vertical and a horizontal arrow in the compass as well. But they are essentially read in the same way. On some aircraft is only the glideslope indicated on two main instruments, and the oldest version of ILS-instruments was an instrument of its own used instead. This used
two dangling bars, fixed in the middle of the top (localizer indicator) and in the middle of the left side (glideslope indicator), and if the aircraft was located on the intended glidepath, the dangling bars formed a cross. This is, in theory, however, more difficult to learn—but even for pilots experienced with using such indicators, it added another instrument they needed to focus on. With the indicators added to the artificial horizon (and to the compass), the pilot can theoretically watch the attitude simultaneously with the localizer and glideslope. 

In modern cockpits, the localizer is seen as a colored dot (usually in the shape of a diamond) at the bottom of the artificial horizon gauge. It does not appear during cruise, but comes up during the descent and approach to the selected runway, provided that the navigation radio is set to the ILS frequency of that specific runway. If the transmitted localizer beam, which usually, but not always, is directed in the heading of the runway extension. (exceptions exist, for instance, in Innsbruck, Austria and in Macao)
If the aircraft is located on this line, the localizer dot will appear in the middle of the scale. But if the aircraft is located a little left of the beam, the marker will appear to the right on the localizer gauge scale in cockpit. The pilot then knows he or she must adjust the heading towards the dot.
 
In older cockpits, the localizer scale below the artificial horizon is rather short. But in older style cockpit instrumentation, the localizer also appears as an arrow in the gyro compass below the artificial horizon. The top and bottom of this arrow "is one unit", which shows current heading. But the middle part of this arrow is moving independently of the aircraft's heading. The middle of that arrow could be described as being "stand alone", and moves to the left if the aircraft is located to the right of localizer beam and to the right if the aircraft is located to the left of the localizer beam. When the arrow is "united" to a straight line, then the aircraft is following the localizer beam. (This second "arrow-indicator" is omitted in modern cockpits, but the main compass is still located below the artificial horizon.)

The very first generation of localizer gauges had a different cockpit interface, and were not included in the artificial horizon nor any compass, but at a gauge of its own. The localizer was then represented as a dangling stick hanging from a fixed point at the top of a separate gauge, and the glideslope was represented by a similar, but horizontal, dangling stick, fixed at one of the sides of the gauge. When the aircraft was located exactly at the ILS-beam (or glidepath) the two sticks formed a cross. This interface resembles the flight director, which also forms a cross, but on the artificial horizon.
This older ILS instrumentation system was omitted around the same time as jet airliners like Boeing 707 and DC 8 were introduced.

The expression "catch the localizer" refers to runway approaches with the autopilot engaged. The angle between the aircraft heading and localizer beam should be less than 30 degrees, and the indicated airspeed at least below 250 knots (for jet airliners), then by pushing a button marked "APP" or "ILS", then the autopilot presumably will turn and then follow the localizer. The autopilot will then also automatically descend according to the glideslope. Normal procedure is to capture the localizer first and then follow the glideslope as well. If the angle is too large or the airspeed too high, capturing the localizer may be unsuccessful.

Modern aircraft can land "themselves", provided the runway ILS is of sufficient standard (class III C) and the cross wind component is low. Autolandings are mostly done when the visibility is low.

The cockpit ILS indicators are not to be confused with the flight director, which also places vertical and horizontal lines on the artificial horizon. A flight director only shows how the autopilot would fly. If the localizer dot (or arrow) indicate runway is to be found to the left, but the flight director suggests a right turn, and the runway isn't visible, then the pilot in command is having difficulties.

Localizer at runways

When the glideslope is unserviceable, the localizer element can often be conducted as a separate non-precision approach; or a standalone instrument approach installation without an associated glidepath, both are abbreviated as 'LOC' (or 'LLZ' prior to 2007.)

See also
 AN/MRN-1
 Andrew Alford
 Localizer type directional aid (LDA)
 Simplified directional facility

References

Aeronautical navigation systems
Aircraft landing systems
Radio navigation
Radio stations and systems ITU
Navigational aids